Motisar is an Indian community from Rajasthan and Gujarat known for folk-poetry.  They were well respected & patronised by the Charans.

Origin 
Motisars claim they were originally Rajputs of Jhala, Khichi, Parihar and other clans, who became devotees & worshippers of Avad Mata. The goddess Avad granted these devotees the divine gift of poetry.

History 
Motisars functioned as one of the genealogist castes for the Charans. They also composed poems & praised them.

In the past, Motisars would leave their homes after Dussehra and visit the villages of Charans who patronised them. They received gifts and returned home after four to six months.

See also 
Rawal

References 

Indian castes
Charan
Social groups of Rajasthan
Social groups of Gujarat